Maher Hasnaoui (born 22 September 1989) is a Tunisian cyclist.

Major results

2008
 2nd Road race, National Road Championships
2009
 1st  Road race, National Road Championships
2010
 1st  Time trial, Arab Road Championships
 3rd Road race, National Road Championships
2011
 2nd  Team time trial, Pan Arab Games
 2nd  Road race, Arab Under-23 Road Championships
2012
 2nd  Team time trial, African Road Championships
 National Road Championships
2nd Road race
3rd Time trial
2013
 1st Trophée de la Maison Royale, Challenge du Prince
 National Road Championships
2nd Road race
2nd Time trial
2014
 2nd Road race, National Road Championships
2015
 1st Overall Tour of Al Zubarah
1st Stage 1
 1st UAE Cup
 1st Stage 2 (TTT) Jelajah Malaysia
 2nd Time trial, National Road Championships
2016
 National Road Championships
1st  Time trial
3rd Road race
2017
 National Road Championships
2nd Road race
2nd Time trial
 4th Overall Tour de Tunisie
1st Stage 4
2018
 National Road Championships
2nd Road race
2nd Time trial
 7th Overall Tour de la Pharmacie Centrale
 10th Overall Tour d'Algérie
2019
 3rd Time trial, National Road Championships

References

External links

1989 births
Living people
Tunisian male cyclists
21st-century Tunisian people